Cát Tiên archaeological site or Cát Tiên Sanctuary is an archaeological site located between the two sectors of Cát Tiên National Park, Cát Tiên District, Lâm Đồng Province, southern Central Highlands. Accidentally discovered in 1985, the site has been subjected to debate among historians about its origin. The highly Indianized civilization which developed this site inhabited it between the 4th century and 9th centuries AD. The hill temple 1A of Cát Tiên features the largest stone lingam ever found in Southeast Asia.

Gallery

References

External links
Cat Tien Relics, 
Cat Tien Relics, 
The Cat Tien Relic, 

Populated places established in the 4th century
Archaeological sites in Vietnam
Culture of Vietnamese Central-Highlands 
Indianized kingdoms